Rowett Island is a rocky island  long, lying immediately off Cape Lookout, Elephant Island, in the South Shetland Islands. Rowett Island was known to both American and British sealers as early as 1822. Rowett Island was named by members of a British expedition (1921-1922) under Ernest Shackleton for John Quiller Rowett, chief patron of the expedition.

See also
 Composite Antarctic Gazetteer
 List of Antarctic and sub-Antarctic islands
 List of Antarctic islands south of 60° S
 SCAR
 Territorial claims in Antarctica

References

External links 

Islands of the South Shetland Islands